Paectes is a genus of moths of the family Euteliidae erected by Jacob Hübner in 1818.

Description
Palpi upturned, reaching just above vertex of head. Thorax smoothly scaled. Abdomen with tufts on first segment and very long, with a large anal tubular tuft especially in male. Forewing with nearly straight costa, rectangular apex, obliquely curved outer margin and near base lobed inner margin. in most species, antennae of male bipectinated and tibia hairy. And in some, antennae of male pectinated for two-thirds of length and fore tibia with a tuft of long hair from femur-tibia joint.

Species
 Paectes abrostolella Walker, 1866
 Paectes abrostoloides Guenée, 1852
 Paectes acutangula Hampson, 1912
 Paectes arcigera Guenée, 1852
 Paectes asper Pogue, 2013
 Paectes costistrigata Bethune-Baker, 1906
 Paectes cyanodes Turner, 1902
 Paectes declinata Grote, 1879
 Paectes delineata Guenée, 1852
 Paectes fuscescens Walker, 1855
 Paectes longiformis Pogue, 2012
 Paectes lunodes (Guenée, 1852)
 Paectes medialba Pogue, 2013
 Paectes nana (Walker, 1865)
 Paectes nubifera Hampson, 1912
 Paectes obrotunda Guenée, 1852
 Paectes oculatrix Guenée, 1852
 Paectes pygmaea Hübner, 1818 (syn: Paectes flabella (Grote, 1879))
 Paectes silvaini Barbut & Lalanne-Cassou, 2005
 Paectes similis Pogue, 2013
 Paectes sinuosa Pogue, 2013
 Paectes tumida Pogue, 2013

References

External links

Euteliinae